McHale's Navy is a 1964 technicolor comedy film based on the 1962–1966 black and white television sitcom McHale's Navy starring Ernest Borgnine, Tim Conway and Joe Flynn, which had in turn originated with a one-hour anthology drama starring Borgnine entitled Seven Against the Sea.  The film version was directed by series producer Edward Montagne and its supporting cast includes Carl Ballantine, Gavin MacLeod, Jean Willes, Claudine Longet, and George Kennedy.  The film was followed by a sequel entitled McHale's Navy Joins the Air Force which did not feature Borgnine or Carl Ballantine.  A remake entitled McHale's Navy, was released in 1997 and features an appearance by Ernest Borgnine playing a 75-year old McHale.
The filming location for New Caledonia is the same as the one used in the series. For more information on the main characters see the TV series McHale's Navy. The movie was released on DVD for Region 1 on January 31, 2011.

The film was released following the end of the second season of the television series.

Plot
Set "Somewhere in the South Pacific" in 1943, Gruber's gambling scheme backfires when he tries to raise money for St Theresa's Orphanage through off-track horserace betting. Heavy bets on the horse "Silver Spot" leaves the crew owing a large sum to sailors and marines. A little while later when the crew is in New Caledonia, Ensign Parker runs PT-73 into the dock and destroys the dock and cargo of businessman Henri Le Clerc (George Kennedy), leaving the crew even more in debt. However, while on a reconnaissance mission to an island the crew comes across Silver Spot who was lost on the island after the horse was being moved from Australia. They decide to enter Silver Spot in a race in New Caledonia to win enough money to pay all their debts. Otherwise the only way to pay all their debts is for McHale to marry his old flame Margot Monet (Jean Willes), also known as Maggie Monahan, who owns a gambling parlor in New Caledonia (but who McHale would rather not marry). They try to disguise the horse with much heavy hair, but when the hair starts to come off during the race they decide to use a smoke screen from the 73 to keep anyone from seeing too much. However, this made it impossible for the racetrack authorities to know who won. But the smokescreen also caused a Japanese submarine to be captured by the 73. In the end Le Clerc is so grateful for saving his town from a Japanese attack he forgives the debt. The crew also gets a reward for rescuing Silver Spot which just happened to be enough to pay the sailors and marines. While all this was going on the PT-73 crew was dogging Binghamton (Joe Flynn) and his aide Carpenter (Bob Hastings). And just as they were leaving New Caledonia the bashful Parker is kissed by Bouchard and the lightheaded Parker accidentally sets off a depth charge which destroys Le Clerc's dock and cargo again. But rather than marry Monet to pay for the new damage, McHale and crew immediately scramble to get out of New Caledonia.

Cast

 Ernest Borgnine as Lieutenant Commander Quinton McHale
 Tim Conway as Ensign Charles Parker
 Joe Flynn as Captain Wallace B. Binghamton ("Old Leadbottom")
 Bob Hastings as Lieutenant Elroy Carpenter
 Gary Vinson as George "Christy" Christopher, Quartermaster
 Bobby Wright as Willy Moss, Radioman
 Carl Ballantine as Lester Gruber, Torpedoman's Mate
 Billy Sands as Harrison "Tinker" Bell, Engineman & Motor Machinist Mate
 Edson Stroll as Virgil Edwards, Gunner's Mate
 Gavin MacLeod as Joseph "Happy" Haines, Seaman
 Yoshio Yoda as Fuji Kobiaji, Cook, Seaman 3C, Japanese PW.
 George Kennedy as Henri Le Clerc
 Jean Willes as Margot Monet (Maggie Monahan)
 Claudine Longet as Andrea Bouchard
 Cliff Norton as Australian sergeant major
 Marcel Hillaire as Chief de Gendarmes

See also
List of American films of 1964

References

External links
 
 
 

1960s war comedy films
1964 films
Films set in 1943
American war comedy films
Military humor in film
Films about the United States Navy in World War II
Universal Pictures films
Films directed by Edward Montagne
Films scored by Jerry Fielding
Films set in New Caledonia
1964 comedy films
1960s English-language films
1960s American films
McHale's Navy